Piz Boè is the highest mountain of the Sella Group, a mountain-range in the Dolomites, Italy.

Located in the heart of the Dolomites, the mountain has a beautiful pyramid summit. Its popularity has increased as it is thought of as the easiest 3000m summit to reach in the Dolomites, and can get overcrowded in the summer. It lies just above the Pordoi Pass. Due to its location, most of the major Dolomiten peaks are visible from its summit.

View from the top

References

External links

Home - Rifugio Boè
Rifugio Capanna Piz Fassa
Rifugio Forcella Pordoi
Piz Boè on Hike.uno

Mountains of South Tyrol
Mountains of Trentino
Mountains of Veneto
Mountains of the Alps
Alpine three-thousanders
Dolomites